Emergency landing is an unplanned landing  by an aircraft.

Emergency Landing may also refer to:
 Emergency Landing (1941 film), an American film directed by William Beaudine
 Emergency Landing (1952 film), a Norwegian film (Nødlanding), directed by Arne Skouen

See also 
 Crash Landing (disambiguation)
 Forced landing
 Water landing